The 2018 Yas Marina FIA Formula 2 round was a pair of motor races held on 24 and 25 November 2018 at the Yas Marina Circuit in Abu Dhabi, United Arab Emirates as part of the FIA Formula 2 Championship. It was the final showdown of the 2018 FIA Formula 2 Championship and was run in support of the 2018 Abu Dhabi Grand Prix.

With his seventh race win of the season, George Russell claimed the championship title after winning the Feature Race in Abu Dhabi and became the second rookie in the modern Formula 2 era to win the championship after Charles Leclerc, who had won the championship in the previous season with a joint-record 7 wins.

Classifications

Qualifying

Notes
 – Niko Kari was given a three-place grid penalty for leaving the track and gaining an advantage at the previous round in Sochi.
 – Alessio Lorandi was given a five-place grid penalty for causing a collision at the previous round in Sochi.

Feature Race

Sprint Race

Final championship standings

Drivers' Championship standings

Teams' Championship standings

References

External links 
 

Yas Marina
Formula 2
Formula 2